Diethyl dixanthogen disulfide is the organosulfur compound with the formula . It is one of the most common dixanthogen disulfides, compounds of the type  (R = alkyl).  A yellow solid,  It is obtained by oxidation of sodium ethylxanthate or potassium ethylxanthate.  

According to X-ray crystallography, the two  groups in solid diethyl dixanthogen disulfide are planar and are linked by a disulfide bond.  The C-S-S-C dihedral angle is near 90°, as is common for acyclic disulfides.

Occurrence and reactions
Diethylxanthogen reacts with aqueous base to regenerate the xanthate, at least partially.

Diethylxanthogen arises by oxidation of xanthates during froth flotation.  Diethylxanthogens are thought to participate in the flotation of certain sulfide minerals.

References

Thiocarbonyl compounds
Organic disulfides